The Microregion of Andradina is located on the northwest of São Paulo state, Brazil, and is made up of 11 municipalities. It belongs to the Mesoregion of Araçatuba.

The population of the Microregion is 181,710 inhabitants, in an area of 6,891.6 km²

Municipalities 
The microregion consists of the following municipalities, listed below with their 2010 Census populations (IBGE/2010):

Andradina: 55,334
Castilho: 18,003
Guaraçaí: 8,435
Ilha Solteira: 25,064
Itapura: 4,357
Mirandópolis: 27,483
Murutinga do Sul: 4,186
Nova Independência: 22,576
Pereira Barreto: 24,962
Sud Mennucci: 7,435
Suzanápolis: 3,383

References

Andradina